The 1999–2000 Vysshaya Liga season was the eighth season of the Vysshaya Liga, the second level of ice hockey in Russia. 23 teams participated in the league. The top four teams in the final round qualified for an opportunity to be promoted to the Russian Superleague.

First round

Western Conference

Eastern Conference

Final round

Relegation

Western zone

Eastern zone 
 Metallurg Serov – Mostovik Kurgan 2:3 OT, 1:8, 7:2, 4:2, 5:0
 Motor Barnaul – Energija Kemerovo 2:1, 3:6, 3:2, 1:4, 0:1

External links 
 Season on hockeyarchives.info
 Season on hockeyarchives.ru

2
Russian Major League seasons
Rus